Stefano Avogadri (born 11 August 1985) is an Italian former footballer.

Biography
Born in Treviglio, Lombardy, Avogadri started his professional career at Emilian club Piacenza. He followed the club relegated to the third division in 2011. In 2012 Avogadri became a free agent after the collapse of the former Serie A team. In October 2012 Avogadri joined Romanian club Petrolul Ploiești. In January 2013 he returned to Italy for the third division side Cremonese. He renewed his contract in June 2013.

In 2014 Avogadri was signed by Ascoli.

References

External links
 AIC profile (data by www.football.it) 
 
 
 

Italian footballers
Footballers from Lombardy
Piacenza Calcio 1919 players
A.C. Legnano players
FC Petrolul Ploiești players
U.S. Cremonese players
Ascoli Calcio 1898 F.C. players
Pisa S.C. players
Serie B players
Serie C players
Liga I players
Association football defenders
Italian expatriate sportspeople in Romania
Expatriate footballers in Romania
Italian expatriate footballers
People from Treviglio
1985 births
Living people